Michel de Sousa Fernandes Alcobia de Almeida (born 28 September 1974) is a Portuguese judoka. He competed at the 1996 Summer Olympics and the 2000 Summer Olympics.

Achievements

See also 
 Judo in Canada
 List of Canadian judoka

References

External links

1974 births
Living people
Portuguese male judoka
Olympic judoka of Portugal
Judoka at the 1996 Summer Olympics
Judoka at the 2000 Summer Olympics
Universiade medalists in judo
Universiade bronze medalists for Portugal
Medalists at the 1999 Summer Universiade
20th-century Portuguese people
21st-century Portuguese people